Bavaria, officially the Free State of Bavaria, is a state in the south-east of Germany. With over 13 million inhabitants, it is the second largest German state in terms of population only to North Rhine-Westphalia, but due to its large size its population density is below the German average. Bavaria's main cities are Munich (its capital and largest city and also the third largest city in Germany), Nuremberg, and Augsburg.

The history of Bavaria includes its earliest settlement by Iron Age Celtic tribes, followed by the conquests of the Roman Empire in the 1st century BC, when the territory was incorporated into the provinces of Raetia and Noricum. It became the Duchy of Bavaria (a stem duchy) in the 6th century AD following the collapse of the Western Roman Empire. It was later incorporated into the Holy Roman Empire, became an independent kingdom after 1806, joined the Prussian-led German Empire in 1871 while retaining its title of kingdom, and finally became a state of the Federal Republic of Germany in 1949.

Bavaria has a unique culture, largely because of the state's Catholic heritage and conservative traditions. Bavarians have traditionally been proud of their culture, which includes a language, cuisine, architecture, festivals and elements of Alpine symbolism. The state also has the second largest economy among the German states by GDP figures, giving it a status as a wealthy German region.

Contemporary Bavaria also includes parts of the historical regions of Franconia and Swabia.

History

Antiquity

The Bavarians emerged in a region north of the Alps, previously inhabited by Celts, which had been part of the Roman provinces of Raetia and Noricum.

The Bavarians spoke a Germanic dialect which developed into Old High German during the early Middle Ages, however, unlike other Germanic groups, they probably did not migrate from elsewhere when Western Roman influence collapsed.

Rather, they seem to have coalesced out of other groups left behind by the Roman withdrawal late in the 5th century. These peoples may have included the Celtic Boii, some remaining Romans, Marcomanni, Allemanni, Quadi, Thuringians, Goths, Scirians, Rugians, Heruli. The name "Bavarian" ("Baiuvarii") means "Men of Baia" which may indicate Bohemia, the homeland of the Boii and later of the Marcomanni. They first appear in written sources circa 520.

A 17th century Jewish chronicler, David Gans, citing Cyriacus Spangenberg, claimed that the diocese was named after an ancient Bohemian king, Boiia, in the 14th century BC.

Middle Ages

From about 554 to 788, the house of Agilolfing ruled the Duchy of Bavaria, ending with Tassilo III who was deposed by Charlemagne.

Three early dukes are named in Frankish sources: Garibald I may have been appointed to the office by the Merovingian kings and married the Lombard princess Walderada when the church forbade her to King Chlothar I in 555. Their daughter, Theodelinde, became Queen of the Lombards in northern Italy and Garibald was forced to flee to her when he fell out with his Frankish overlords.

Garibald's successor, Tassilo I, tried unsuccessfully to hold the eastern frontier against the expansion of Slavs and Avars around 600. Tassilo's son Garibald II seems to have achieved a balance of power between 610 and 616.

After Garibald II, little is known of the Bavarians until Duke Theodo I, whose reign may have begun as early as 680. From 696 onward, he invited churchmen from the west to organize churches and strengthen Christianity in his duchy. (It is unclear what Bavarian religious life consisted of before this time.)

His son, Theudebert, led a decisive Bavarian campaign to intervene in a succession dispute in the Lombard Kingdom in 714, and married his sister Guntrud to the Lombard King Liutprand. At Theodo's death the duchy was divided among his sons, but reunited under his grandson Hugbert.

At Hugbert's death (735) the duchy passed to a distant relative named Odilo, from neighboring Alemannia (modern southwest Germany and northern Switzerland). Odilo issued a law code for Bavaria, completed the process of church organization in partnership with St. Boniface (739), and tried to intervene in Frankish succession disputes by fighting for the claims of the Carolingian Grifo. He was defeated near Augsburg in 743 but continued to rule until his death in 748.

Saint Boniface completed the people's conversion to Christianity in the early 8th century.
Tassilo III (b. 741 – d. after 796) succeeded his father at the age of eight after an unsuccessful attempt by Grifo to rule Bavaria. He initially ruled under Frankish oversight but began to function independently from 763 onward. He was particularly noted for founding new monasteries and for expanding eastwards, fighting Slavs in the eastern Alps and along the Danube and colonizing these lands.

After 781, however, his cousin Charlemagne began to pressure Tassilo to submit and finally deposed him in 788. The deposition was not entirely legitimate.

Dissenters attempted a coup against Charlemagne at Tassilo's old capital of Regensburg in 792, led by his own son Pépin the Hunchback. The king had to drag Tassilo out of imprisonment to formally renounce his rights and titles at the Assembly of Frankfurt in 794. This is the last appearance of Tassilo in the sources, and he probably died a monk. As all of his family were also forced into monasteries, this was the end of the Agilolfing dynasty.

For the next 400 years numerous families held the duchy, rarely for more than three generations. With the revolt of duke Henry the Quarrelsome in 976, Bavaria lost large territories in the south and south east.

The territory of Ostarrichi was elevated to a duchy in its own right and given to the Babenberger family. This event marks the founding of Austria. Later the counts of Tyrol next to other princes began to act more independently from the dukes of Bavaria, and the new Duchy of Merania was created from lordships once under the jurisdiction of the Duchy of Bavaria.

The last, and one of the most important, of the dukes of Bavaria was Henry the Lion of the house of Welf, founder of Munich, and de facto the second most powerful man in the empire as the ruler of two duchies. When in 1180, Henry the Lion was deposed as Duke of Saxony and Bavaria by his cousin, Frederick I, Holy Roman Emperor (a.k.a. "Barbarossa" for his red beard), Bavaria was awarded as fief to the Wittelsbach family, counts palatinate of Schyren ("Scheyern" in modern German). They ruled for 738 years, from 1180 to 1918. In 1180 however also Styria was separated from Bavaria. The Electorate of the Palatinate by Rhine (Kurpfalz in German) was also acquired by the House of Wittelsbach in 1214, which they would subsequently hold for six centuries.

The first of several divisions of the duchy of Bavaria occurred in 1255. With the extinction of the Hohenstaufen in 1268, Swabian territories were acquired by the Wittelsbach dukes. Emperor Louis the Bavarian acquired Brandenburg, Tyrol, Holland and Hainaut for his House but released the Upper Palatinate for the Palatinate branch of the Wittelsbach in 1329. That time also Salzburg finally became independent from the Duchy of Bavaria.

In the 14th and 15th centuries, upper and lower Bavaria were repeatedly subdivided. Four Duchies existed after the division of 1392: Bavaria-Straubing, Bavaria-Landshut, Bavaria-Ingolstadt and Bavaria-Munich. In 1506 with the Landshut War of Succession, the other parts of Bavaria were reunited, and Munich became the sole capital. The country became a center of the Jesuit-inspired Counter-Reformation.

Electorate of Bavaria

In 1623 the Bavarian duke replaced his relative of the Palatinate branch, the Electorate of the Palatinate in the early days of the Thirty Years' War and acquired the powerful prince-electoral dignity in the Holy Roman Empire, determining its Emperor thence forward, as well as special legal status under the empire's laws.

During the early and mid-18th century the ambitions of the Bavarian prince electors led to several wars with Austria as well as occupations by Austria (War of the Spanish Succession, War of the Austrian Succession with the election of a Wittelsbach emperor instead of a Habsburg).

From 1777 onward, and after the younger Bavarian branch of the family had died out with elector Max III Joseph, Bavaria and the Electorate of the Palatinate were governed once again in personal union, now by the Palatinian lines.

The new state also comprised the Duchies of Jülich and Berg as these on their part were in personal union with the Palatinate.

Kingdom of Bavaria

When Napoleon abolished the Holy Roman Empire, Bavaria became – by grace of Napoleon – a kingdom in 1806 due, in part, to the Confederation of the Rhine.

Its area doubled after the Duchy of Jülich was ceded to France, as the Electoral Palatinate was divided between France and the Grand Duchy of Baden. The Duchy of Berg was given to Jerome Bonaparte. Tyrol and Salzburg were temporarily reunited with Bavaria but finally ceded to Austria by the Congress of Vienna.

In return Bavaria was allowed to annex the modern-day region of Palatinate to the west of the Rhine and Franconia in 1815. Between 1799 and 1817, the leading minister, Count Montgelas, followed a strict policy of modernisation copying Napoleonic France; he laid the foundations of centralized administrative structures that survived the monarchy and, in part, have retained core validity through the 20st century.

In May 1808, a first constitution was passed by Maximilian I, being modernized in 1818. This second version established a bicameral Parliament with a House of Lords (Kammer der Reichsräte) and a House of Commons (Kammer der Abgeordneten). That constitution was followed until the collapse of the monarchy at the end of World War I.

After the rise of Prussia to power in the early 18th century, Bavaria preserved its independence by playing off the rivalry of Prussia and Austria. Allied to Austria, it was defeated along with Austria in the 1866 Austro-Prussian War and was not incorporated into the North German Confederation of 1867, but the question of German unity was still alive. When France declared war on Prussia in 1870, all the south German states (Baden, Württemberg, Hessen-Darmstadt and Bavaria) aside from Austria, joined the Prussian forces and ultimately joined the Federation, which was renamed Deutsches Reich (German Empire) in 1871.

Bavaria continued formally as a monarchy, and it had some special rights within the federation (such as an army, railways, postal service and a diplomatic body of its own) but the diplomatic body were later undone by Wilhelm II who declared them illegal and got rid of the diplomatic service.

Part of the German Empire

When Bavaria became part of the newly formed German Empire, this action was considered controversial by Bavarian nationalists who had wanted to retain independence from the rest of Germany, as had Austria.

As Bavaria had a heavily Catholic majority population, many people resented being ruled by the mostly Protestant northerners of Prussia. As a direct result of the Bavarian-Prussian feud, political parties formed to encourage Bavaria to break away and regain its independence.

In the early 20th century, Wassily Kandinsky, Paul Klee, Henrik Ibsen, and other artists were drawn to Bavaria, especially to the Schwabing district of Munich, a center of international artistic activity.

Free State of Bavaria

Free State has been an adopted designation after the abolition of monarchy in the aftermath of World War I in several German states.

On 12 November 1918, Ludwig III signed a document, the Anif declaration, releasing both civil and military officers from their oaths; the newly formed republican government, or "People's State" of Socialist premier Kurt Eisner, interpreted this as an abdication. To date, however, no member of the House of Wittelsbach has ever formally declared renunciation of the throne.

On the other hand, none has ever since officially called upon their Bavarian or Stuart claims. Family members are active in cultural and social life, including the head of the house, Franz, Duke of Bavaria. They step back from any announcements on public affairs, showing approval or disapproval solely by Franz's presence or absence.

Eisner was assassinated in February 1919, ultimately leading to a Communist revolt and the short-lived Bavarian Soviet Republic being proclaimed 6 April 1919. After violent suppression by elements of the German Army and notably the Freikorps, the Bavarian Soviet Republic fell in May 1919. The Bamberg Constitution was enacted on 12 or 14 August 1919 and came into force on 15 September 1919 creating the Free State of Bavaria within the Weimar Republic.

Extremist activity further increased, notably the 1923 Beer Hall Putsch led by the National Socialists, and Munich and Nuremberg became seen as Nazi strongholds during the Weimar Republic and Nazi dictatorship. However, in the crucial German federal election, March 1933, the Nazis received less than 50% of the votes cast in Bavaria.

As a manufacturing centre, Munich was heavily bombed during World War II and was occupied by U.S. troops, becoming a major part of the American Zone of Allied-occupied Germany (1945–47) and then of "Bizonia".

The Rhenish Palatinate was detached from Bavaria in 1946 and made part of the new state Rhineland-Palatinate. During the Cold War, Bavaria was part of West Germany. In 1949, the Free State of Bavaria chose not to sign the Founding Treaty (Gründungsvertrag) for the formation of the Federal Republic of Germany, opposing the division of Germany into two countries after World War II.

The Bavarian Parliament did not sign the Basic Law of Germany, mainly because it was seen as not granting sufficient powers to the individual Länder (states), but at the same time decided that it would still come into force in Bavaria if two-thirds of the other Länder ratified it. 
All of the other Länder ratified it, however, so it became law.

Bavarian identity

Bavarians have often emphasized a separate national identity and considered themselves as "Bavarians" first, "Germans" second.

In the 19th-century sense, an independent Bavarian State only existed from 1806 to 1871. This feeling started to come about more strongly among Bavarians when the Kingdom of Bavaria was forced by Bismarck to join the Protestant Prussian-dominated German Empire in 1871, while the Bavarian nationalists wanted to keep Bavaria as Catholic and an independent state. Aside from the minority Bavaria Party, most Bavarians now accept Bavaria is part of Germany.

Another consideration is that Bavarians foster different cultural identities: Franconia in the north, speaking East Franconian German; Bavarian Swabia in the south west, speaking Swabian German; and Altbayern (so-called "Old Bavaria", the regions forming the "historic", pentagon-shaped Bavaria before the acquisitions through the Vienna Congress, at present the districts of the Upper Palatinate, Lower and Upper Bavaria) speaking Austro-Bavarian.

In Munich, the Old Bavarian dialect was widely spread, but nowadays High German is predominantly spoken there.

Flags and coat of arms

Flags
Uniquely among German states, Bavaria has two official flags of equal status, one with a white and blue stripe, the other with white and blue lozenges. Either may be used by civilians and government offices, who are free to choose between them. Unofficial versions of the flag, especially a lozenge style with coat of arms, are sometimes used by civilians.

Coat of arms
The modern coat of arms of Bavaria was designed by Eduard Ege in 1946, following heraldic traditions.
The Golden Lion: At the dexter chief, sable, a lion rampant Or, armed and langued gules. This represents the administrative region of Upper Palatinate.
The "Franconian Rake": At the sinister chief, per fess dancetty, gules, and argent. This represents the administrative regions of Upper, Middle and Lower Franconia.
The Blue "Pantier" (mythical creature from French heraldry, sporting a flame instead of a tongue): At the dexter base, argent, a Pantier rampant azure, armed Or and langued gules. This represents the regions of Lower and Upper Bavaria.
The Three Lions: At the sinister base, Or, three lions passant guardant sable, armed and langued gules. This represents Swabia.
The White-And-Blue inescutcheon: The inescutcheon of white and blue fusils askance was originally the coat of arms of the Counts of Bogen, adopted in 1247 by the House of Wittelsbach. The white-and-blue fusils are indisputably the emblem of Bavaria and these arms today symbolize Bavaria as a whole. Along with the People's Crown, it is officially used as the Minor Coat of Arms.
The People's Crown (Volkskrone): The coat of arms is surmounted by a crown with a golden band inset with precious stones and decorated with five ornamental leaves. This crown first appeared in the coat of arms to symbolize sovereignty of the people after the royal crown was eschewed in 1923.

Geography

Bavaria shares international borders with Austria (Salzburg, Tyrol, Upper Austria and Vorarlberg) and the Czech Republic (Karlovy Vary, Plzeň and South Bohemian Regions), as well as with Switzerland (across Lake Constance to the Canton of St. Gallen). All of these countries are part of the Schengen Area, so the borders are completely open (except during COVID-19).

Neighboring states within Germany are Baden-Württemberg, Hesse, Thuringia, and Saxony. Two major rivers flow through the state: the Danube (Donau) and the Main. The Bavarian Forest and the Bohemian Forest form the vast majority of the frontier with the Czech Republic and Bohemia.

The major cities in Bavaria are Munich (München), Nuremberg (Nürnberg), Augsburg, Regensburg, Würzburg, Ingolstadt, Fürth, and Erlangen.

The geographic center of the European Union is located in the northwestern corner of Bavaria.

Mountains
The Bavarian Alps define the border with Austria (including the Austrian federal-states of Vorarlberg, Tyrol and Salzburg), and within the range is the highest peak in Germany: the Zugspitze.
Geuserberg
Haidberg bei Zell
Kellerberg (Forchheim)
Kordigast
Lindenstumpf
Ospis

Hills
Heidkopf (Spessart)
Hohe Mark (Spessart)
Parsberg (hill)
Reisberg (Scheßlitz)

Climate
At lower elevations the climate is classified according to Köppen's guide as “Cfb” or “Dfb” at lower altitudes, then at higher altitudes the climate becomes “Dfc” and “ET”.

The summer months have been getting hotter in recent years. For example, June 2019 was the warmest June in Bavaria since weather observations have been recorded and the winter 2019/2020 was 3 degrees Celsius warmer than the average temperature for many years all over Bavaria. In general winter months are seeing more precipitation which is taking the form of rain more often than that of snow compared to the past. Extreme weather like the 2013 European floods or the 2019 European heavy snowfalls is occurring more and more often. One effect of the continuing warming is the melting of almost all Bavarian Alpine glaciers: Of the five glaciers of Bavaria only the Höllentalferner is predicted to exist over a longer time perspective. The Südliche Schneeferner has almost vanished since the 1980s.

Administrative divisions

Administrative regions

Bavaria is divided into seven administrative regions called  (singular ).
Altbayern:
Upper Palatinate
Upper Bavaria
Lower Bavaria
Franconia:
Upper Franconia
Middle Franconia
Lower Franconia
Swabia:
Swabia

Bezirke

Population and area

Districts
The second communal layer is made up of 71 rural districts (called , singular ) that are comparable to counties, as well as the 25 independent cities (singular ), both of which share the same administrative responsibilities.

Rural districts:

Independent cities:

Municipalities
The 71 rural districts are on the lowest level divided into 2,031 regular municipalities (called , singular ). Together with the 25 independent cities (which are in effect municipalities independent of  administrations), there are a total of 2,056 municipalities in Bavaria.

Major cities and towns

Source: Bayerisches Landesamt für Statistik und Datenverarbeitung

Politics

Bavaria has a multiparty system dominated by the conservative Christian Social Union (CSU), which has won every election since 1945 with the exception of the 1950 ballot. Other important parties are The Greens, which became the second biggest political party in the 2018 local parliament elections and the center-left Social Democrats (SPD), who have dominated the city of Munich until 2020. Hitherto, Wilhelm Hoegner has been the only SPD candidate to ever become Minister-President; notable successors in office include multi-term Federal Minister Franz Josef Strauss, a key figure among West German conservatives during the Cold War years, and Edmund Stoiber, who both failed with their bids for Chancellorship.

The German Greens and the center-right Free Voters have been represented in the state parliament since 1986 and 2008 respectively.

In the 2003 elections the CSU won a ⅔ supermajority – something no party had ever achieved in postwar Germany. However, in the subsequent 2008 elections the CSU lost the absolute majority for the first time in 46 years.

The losses were partly attributed by some to the CSU's stance for an anti-smoking bill. (A first anti-smoking law had been proposed by the CSU and passed but was watered down after the election, after which a referendum enforced a strict antismoking bill with a large majority).

Current Landtag 

The last state elections were held on 14 October 2018 in which the CSU lost its absolute majority in the state parliament in part due to the party's stances as part of the federal government, winning 37.2% of the vote; the party's second worst local election outcome in its history after 1950. The Greens who had surged in the polls leading up to the election have replaced the social-democratic SPD as the second biggest force in the Landtag with 17.6% of the vote. The SPD lost over half of its previous share compared to 2013 with a mere 9.7% in 2018. The liberals of the FDP were again able to reach the five-percent-threshold in order to receive mandates in parliament after they were not part of the Landtag after the 2013 elections. Also entering the new parliament were the right-wing populist Alternative for Germany (AfD), with 10.2% of the vote.

The center-right Free Voters party gained 11.6% of the vote and formed a government coalition with the CSU which led to the subsequent reelection of Markus Söder as Minister-President of Bavaria.

Government
Bavarian Cabinet since 12 November 2018
The Constitution of Bavaria of the Free State of Bavaria was enacted on 8 December 1946. The new Bavarian Constitution became the basis for the Bavarian State after the Second World War.

Bavaria has a unicameral  (English: State Parliament), elected by universal suffrage.

The Bavarian State Government consists of the Minister-President of Bavaria, eleven Ministers and six Secretaries of State. The Minister-President is elected for a period of five years by the State Parliament and is head of state. With the approval of the State Parliament he appoints the members of the State Government. The State Government is composed of the:

State Chancellery
Ministry of the Interior, for Sport and Integration
Ministry for Housing, Construction and Transport
Ministry of Justice
Ministry for Education and Culture
Ministry for Science and Art
Ministry of Finance and for Home Affairs
Ministry for Economic Affairs, Regional Development and Energy
Ministry for Environment and Consumer Protection
Ministry for Food, Agriculture and Forestry
Ministry for Family, Labour and Social Affairs
Ministry for Health and Care
Ministry for Digital Affairs

Political processes also take place in the seven regions ( or ) in Bavaria, in the 71 rural districts and the 25 towns and cities forming their own districts, and in the 2,031 local authorities.

In 1995 Bavaria introduced direct democracy on the local level in a referendum. This was initiated bottom-up by an association called Mehr Demokratie (English: More Democracy). This is a grass-roots organization which campaigns for the right to citizen-initiated referendums. In 1997 the Bavarian Supreme Court tightened the regulations considerably (including by introducing a turn-out quorum). Nevertheless, Bavaria has the most advanced regulations on local direct democracy in Germany. This has led to a spirited citizens' participation in communal and municipal affairs—835 referendums took place from 1995 through 2005.

Minister-presidents of Bavaria since 1945

Designation as a "free state"
Unlike most German states (Länder), which simply designate themselves as "State of" (Land [...]), Bavaria uses the style of "Free State of Bavaria" (Freistaat Bayern). The difference from other states is purely terminological, as German constitutional law does not draw a distinction between "States" and "Free States". The situation is thus analogous to the United States, where some states use the style "Commonwealth" rather than "State". The term "Free State", a creation of the 19th century and intended to be a German alternative to (or translation of) the Latin-derived republic was common among the states of the Weimar Republic, after German monarchies had been abolished. Unlike most other states – many of which were new creations – Bavaria has resumed this terminology after World War II. Two other states, Saxony and Thuringia, also call themselves "Free State".

Arbitrary arrest and human rights
In July 2017, Bavaria's parliament enacted a new revision of the "Gefährdergesetz", allowing the authorities to imprison a person for a three months term, renewable indefinitely, when they haven't committed a crime but it is assumed that they might commit a crime "in the near future". Critics like the prominent journalist Heribert Prantl have called the law "shameful" and compared it to Guantanamo Bay detention camp, assessed it to be in violation of the European Convention on Human Rights, and also compared it to the legal situation in Russia, where a similar law allows for imprisonment for a maximum term of two years (i.e., not indefinitely).

Economy

Bavaria has long had one of the largest economies of any region in Germany, and in Europe. Its gross domestic product (GDP) in 2007 exceeded €434 billion (about U.S. $600 billion). This makes Bavaria itself one of the largest economies in Europe, and only 20 countries in the world have a higher GDP. The GDP of the region increased to €617.1 billion in 2018, accounting for 18.5% of German economic output. GDP per capita adjusted for purchasing power was €43,500 or 145% of the EU27 average in the same year. The GDP per employee was 114% of the EU average. This makes Bavaria one of the wealthiest regions in Europe. Bavaria has strong economic ties with Austria, Czech Republic, Switzerland, and Northern Italy.
In 2019 GDP was €832.4 ($905.7) billion, €48,323 ($52,577.3) per capita.

Agriculture

The most distinctive high points of Bavarian agriculture are:
Hop growing in region Hallertau, which is up to 80% of German production and exported worldwide.
Inland aquaculture of carps and trout.
The well-hydrated alpine meadows are used to produce large quantities of quality milk, which is used to make a variety of cheese (including blue-veined cheese), yogurt and butter (Meggle). 
The cultivation of asparagus is widespread, which is a very popular new season vegetable. In season ("Spargelzeit") restaurants offer special separated asparagus menu . There is an asparagus museum in Schrobenhausen.
There are farms producing venison from deer and roe.
Viticulture is widespread in Lower Franconia.
Good ecology and strict control allow produce a large amount of organic products ("bio") and baby food.

Industries

Bavaria has the best developed industry in Germany and the lowest unemployment rate with 2.9% as of October 2021.

Branches:
Oil refining. Although there is oil production in Bavaria, it does not meet domestic needs. Most of the oil is imported via pipelines from the Czech Republic (Russian oil) and from the Italian port of Trieste (Near East oil). Three refineries are situated near Ingolstadt and another one in Burghausen. Last one is a part of Bavarian chemical triangle and delivery row materials to other chemical plants.

Automotive is the most important and best developed Bavarian industry, which included manufacture of luxury cars (4 BMW and 2 Audi plants, R&D centers, test tracks), trucks (Traton MAN), special vehicles (Tadano Faun), buses (Evobus/Setra) and automotive parts (engines, electronics, cables, seats, interiors, cabrio roofs, heating and brake systems, software). Bavaria has the second-most employees (207,829) in the automotive industry of all German states after Baden-Württemberg as of 2018.

Aerospace and defense, which manufacture multi-role attack jet Eurofighter Typhoon, missiles from MBDA and Diehl Defence, parts of rocket Ariane, regional jet Dornier 728, ultra-light planes from Grob Aerospace, turbo jet engines for civil and military applications from MTU Aero Engines, helicopters Airbus, main battle tank Leopard 2, drones, composite parts, avionics, radars, propellants, initiators, powder, munitions. In Munich suburban Oberpfaffenhofen situated control center of European satellite navigation system Galileo, German Space Operations Center, Microwaves and Radar Institute, Institute of Communications and Navigation, Remote Sensing Technology Institute, Institute of Atmospheric Physics, Institute of Robotics and Mechatronics, Institute for Software Technology, Institute of System Dynamics and Control.

Other transport manufacturing also represents in Bavaria. Even exists ship yards, for example Bavaria Yachtbau, despite location many hundreds kilometers from sea away; manufacturing of 4-stroke marine diesel engine, which using in cruise liners, ferries and warships. Rail technique produce in Munich-Allach (locomotive Siemens Vectron) and rail maintenance vehicle in Freilassing.

Electronics. Chip design centers situated in Munich area (Infineon, Intel, Apple). There are 3 FABs: Infineon in Regensburg, Texas Instruments in Freising and Osram Optosemiconductors also in Regensburg. Power semiconductors are manufactured by Semikron. CNC controls are produced by Heidenhain, Traunreut and Siemens, Amberg. Silicon wafer for electronic manufacturing are delivered from Siltronic plant in Burghausen.

Medical equipment. In Erlangen is a headquarters of Siemens Healthineers which produce devices for computer tomography, interventional X-ray systems, radiation therapy, molecular and magnetic resonance imaging, software. Brainlab creates software and hardware for image-guided surgery. Roche Diagnostics in Penzberg manufactures therapeutic proteins, diagnostic tests, reagents, analyze system and biopharma products.

Brewery. Bavaria has long tradition of brewery, near a half of all German breweries are located here (645 of 1300). All possible types of breweries exist: home brewery of hotel or restaurant, belong to big international concern, state-owned, castle or monastery breweries. The perfect quality of beer is guaranteed by 500-years law ("Reinheitsgebot"), which allow as beer ingredients only water, hops, yeast and malt of barley, wheat or rye. But difference of roasting, fermentation or mixing allow to produce many different types of beers (not brand). Vladimir Putin at 2009 tasted beer from Brauerei Aying, Barack Obama at 2015 also tasted Bavarian beer of Karg Brauerei in Murnau. In Freising situated research center Weihenstephan for brewing and food quality.

Companies
Many large companies are headquartered in Bavaria, including Adidas, Allianz, Airbus, Audi, BMW, Brose, BSH Hausgeräte, HypoVereinsbank, Infineon, KUKA, Traton, MTU Aero Engines, Munich Re, Osram, Puma, Rohde & Schwarz, Schaeffler, Siemens, Wacker Chemie, Linde, Vitesco Technologies, Webasto, Grob, Heidenhain, Koenig & Bauer, Kaeser Compressors, Krones, Knorr-Bremse, Wacker Neuson, Krauss-Maffei Wegmann, Siltronic, Leoni, Fielmann, MediaMarkt, Conrad Electronic, BayWa, ProSiebenSat.1 Media, Telefónica Germany, Knauf, Rehau, Giesecke+Devrient.

Also American companies open a lot of research and development centers in Munich region: Apple (chip design), Google (data security), IBM (Watson technology), Intel (drones and telecommunication chips), General Electric (3D-printers and additive manufacturing), Gleason (gears manufacturing), Texas Instruments (chip design and manufacturing), Coherent (lasers).

Tourism
With 40 million tourists in 2019, Bavaria is the most visited German state and one of Europe's leading tourist destinations.

Attractions include:
Amusement parks: Legoland in Günzburg, Bayern-Park in Reisbach (Vils), Playmobil in Zirndorf, Skyline Park in Bad Wörishofen and Bavaria Filmstadt in Grünwald
Christmas markets in Rothenburg ob der Tauber, Nuremberg and Munich
Factory Outlet Centers: Ingolstadt Village and Wertheim Village
Festivals: Oktoberfest, Nürnberger Frühlingsfest and Nürnberger Herbstfest

Unemployment
The unemployment rate stood at 2.6% in October 2018, the lowest in Germany and one of the lowest in the European Union.

Demographics

Bavaria has a population of approximately 13.1 million inhabitants (2020). 8 of the 80 largest cities in Germany are located within Bavaria with Munich being the largest (1,484,226 inhabitants, approximately 6.1 million when including the broader metropolitan area), followed by Nuremberg (518,370 inhabitants, approximately 3.6 million when including the broader metropolitan area), Augsburg (296,582 inhabitants) and Regensburg (153,094 inhabitants). All other cities in Bavaria had less than 150,000 inhabitants each in 2020. Foreign nationals resident in Bavaria (both immigrants and refugees/asylum seekers) were principally from other EU countries and Turkey.

Vital statistics

Culture
Some features of the Bavarian culture and mentality are remarkably distinct from the rest of Germany. Noteworthy differences (especially in rural areas, less significant in the major cities) can be found with respect to religion, traditions, and language.

Religion

Bavarian culture (Altbayern) has a long and predominant tradition of Roman Catholic faith. Pope Benedict XVI (Joseph Alois Ratzinger) was born in Marktl am Inn in Upper Bavaria and was Cardinal-Archbishop of Munich and Freising. Otherwise, the culturally Franconian and Swabian regions of the modern State of Bavaria are historically more diverse in religiosity, with both Catholic and Protestant traditions. In 1925, 70.0% of the Bavarian population was Catholic, 28.8% was Protestant, 0.7% was Jewish, and 0.5% was placed in other religious categories.

 46.9% of Bavarians adhered to Catholicism (a decline from 70.4% in 1970). 17.2 percent of the population adheres to the Evangelical Lutheran Church in Bavaria, which has also declined since 1970. Three percent was Orthodox, Muslims make up 4.0% of the population of Bavaria. 31.9 percent of Bavarians are irreligious or adhere to other religions.

Traditions
Bavarians commonly emphasize pride in their traditions. Traditional costumes collectively known as Tracht are worn on special occasions and include in Altbayern Lederhosen for males and Dirndl for females. Centuries-old folk music is performed. The Maibaum, or Maypole (which in the Middle Ages served as the community's business directory, as figures on the pole represented the trades of the village), and the bagpipes of the Upper Palatinate region bear witness to the ancient Celtic and Germanic remnants of cultural heritage of the region. There are many traditional Bavarian sports disciplines, e.g. the Aperschnalzen, competitive whipcracking.

Whether in Bavaria, overseas or with citizens from other nations Bavarians continue to cultivate their traditions. They hold festivals and dances to keep their heritage alive.

Food and drink

Bavarians tend to place a great value on food and drink. In addition to their renowned dishes, Bavarians also consume many items of food and drink which are unusual elsewhere in Germany; for example  ("white sausage") or in some instances a variety of entrails. At folk festivals and in many beer gardens, beer is traditionally served by the litre (in a ). Bavarians are particularly proud of the traditional , or beer purity law, initially established by the Duke of Bavaria for the City of Munich (i.e. the court) in 1487 and the duchy in 1516. According to this law, only three ingredients were allowed in beer: water, barley, and hops. In 1906 the  made its way to all-German law, and remained a law in Germany until the EU partly struck it down in 1987 as incompatible with the European common market. German breweries, however, cling to the principle, and Bavarian breweries still comply with it in order to distinguish their beer brands. Bavarians are also known as some of the world's most prolific beer drinkers, with an average annual consumption of 170 liters per person.

Bavaria is also home to the Franconia wine region, which is situated along the river Main in Franconia. The region has produced wine (Frankenwein) for over 1,000 years and is famous for its use of the Bocksbeutel wine bottle. The production of wine forms an integral part of the regional culture, and many of its villages and cities hold their own wine festivals (Weinfeste) throughout the year.

Language and dialects

Three German dialects are most commonly spoken in Bavaria: Austro-Bavarian in Old Bavaria (Upper Bavaria, Lower Bavaria and the Upper Palatinate), Swabian German (an Alemannic German dialect) in the Bavarian part of Swabia (south west) and East Franconian German in Franconia (North). In the small town Ludwigsstadt in the north, district Kronach in Upper Franconia, Thuringian dialect is spoken. During the 20th century an increasing part of the population began to speak Standard German (Hochdeutsch), mainly in the cities.

Ethnography
Bavarians consider themselves to be egalitarian and informal. Their sociability can be experienced at the annual Oktoberfest, the world's largest beer festival, which welcomes around six million visitors every year, or in the famous beer gardens. In traditional Bavarian beer gardens, patrons may bring their own food but buy beer only from the brewery that runs the beer garden.

Sports

Football

Bavaria is home to several football clubs including FC Bayern Munich, 1. FC Nürnberg, FC Augsburg, TSV 1860 Munich, FC Ingolstadt 04 and SpVgg Greuther Fürth. Bayern Munich is the most successful football team in Germany having won a record 32 German titles and 6 UEFA Champions League titles. They are followed by 1. FC Nürnberg who have won 9 titles. SpVgg Greuther Fürth have won 3 championships while TSV 1860 Munich have been champions once.

Basketball
Bavaria is also home to several professional basketball teams, including FC Bayern Munich, Brose Baskets Bamberg, s.Oliver Würzburg, Nürnberg Falcons BC and TSV Oberhaching Tropics.

Ice hockey
There are five Bavarian ice hockey teams playing in the German top-tier league DEL: EHC Red Bull München, Nürnberg Ice Tigers, Augsburger Panther, ERC Ingolstadt, and Straubing Tigers.

Notable people
Many famous people have been born or lived in present-day Bavaria:

Kings: Arnulf of Carinthia, Carloman of Bavaria, Charles the Fat, Lothair I, Louis the Child, Louis the German, Louis the Younger, Ludwig I of Bavaria, Ludwig II of Bavaria, Ludwig III of Bavaria, Maximilian I Joseph of Bavaria, Maximilian II of Bavaria, Otto, King of Bavaria
Religious leaders: Pope Benedict XVI (Joseph Aloisius Ratzinger); Pope Damasus II, Pope Victor II.
Painters: Albrecht Dürer, Albrecht Altdorfer, Carl Spitzweg, Erwin Eisch, Franz von Lenbach, Franz von Stuck, Franz Marc, Gabriele Münter, Hans Holbein the Elder, Johann Christian Reinhart, Lucas Cranach, Paul Klee.
Classical musicians Orlando di Lasso, Christoph Willibald Gluck, Leopold Mozart, Max Reger, Richard Wagner, Richard Strauss, Carl Orff, Johann Pachelbel, Theobald Boehm, Klaus Nomi.
Other musicians Hans-Jürgen Buchner, Barbara Dennerlein, Klaus Doldinger, Franzl Lang, Bands: Spider Murphy Gang, Sportfreunde Stiller, Obscura, Michael Bredl
Opera singers Jonas Kaufmann, Diana Damrau.
Writers, poets and playwrights Hans Sachs, Jean Paul, Friedrich Rückert, August von Platen-Hallermünde, Frank Wedekind, Christian Morgenstern, Oskar Maria Graf, Bertolt Brecht, Lion Feuchtwanger, Thomas Mann, Klaus Mann, Golo Mann, Ludwig Thoma, Michael Ende, Ludwig Aurbacher.
Scientists Max Planck, Wilhelm Conrad Röntgen, Werner Heisenberg, Adam Ries, Joseph von Fraunhofer, Georg Ohm, Johannes Stark, Carl von Linde, Ludwig Prandtl, Rudolf Mössbauer, Lothar Rohde, Hermann Schwarz, Robert Huber, Martin Behaim, Levi Strauss, Rudolf Diesel, Feodor Lynen, Georges J. F. Köhler, Erwin Neher, Ernst Otto Fischer, Johann Deisenhofer.
Physicians Alois Alzheimer, Max Joseph von Pettenkofer, Sebastian Kneipp.
Politicians Ludwig Erhard, Horst Seehofer, Christian Ude, Kurt Eisner, Franz-Josef Strauß, Roman Herzog, Leonard John Rose, Henry Kissinger.
Football players Max Morlock, Karl Mai, Franz Beckenbauer, Sepp Maier, Gerd Müller, Paul Breitner, Bernd Schuster, Klaus Augenthaler, Lothar Matthäus, Philipp Lahm, Bastian Schweinsteiger, Holger Badstuber, Thomas Müller, Mario Götze, Dietmar Hamann, Stefan Reuter
Other sportspeople Bernhard Langer, Dirk Nowitzki
Actors Michael Herbig, Werner Stocker, Helmut Fischer, Walter Sedlmayr, Gustl Bayrhammer, Ottfried Fischer, Ruth Drexel, Elmar Wepper, Fritz Wepper, Uschi Glas, Yank Azman.
Entertainers Siegfried Fischbacher
Film directors Helmut Dietl, Rainer Werner Fassbinder, Bernd Eichinger, Joseph Vilsmaier, Hans Steinhoff, Heinz Badewitz and Werner Herzog.
Designers Peter Schreyer, Damir Doma
Entrepreneurs Charles Diebold, Adi Dassler, Rudolf Dassler, Levi Strauss
Military Claus von Stauffenberg
Nazis: Sepp Dietrich, Karl Fiehler, Karl Gebhardt, Hermann Göring, Heinrich Himmler, Alfred Jodl, Josef Kollmer, Josef Mengele, Ernst Röhm, Franz Ritter von Epp, Julius Streicher
Others: Kaspar Hauser, The Smith of Kochel, Mathias Kneißl, Matthias Klostermayr, Anneliese Michel, Herluka von Bernried

See also

 Outline of Germany
 Former countries in Europe after 1815
 List of Bavaria-related topics
 List of Premiers of Bavaria
 List of rulers of Bavaria

References

Citations

General and cited sources

External links

 Official government website
 Official website of Bayern Tourismus Marketing GmbH
 Bavarian Studies in History and Culture
 Außenwirtschaftsportal Bayern
 Statistics
 

 
Boii
States of Germany
States of the Weimar Republic